Pleurojulidae is an extinct family of millipedes known from the Westphalian stage of the upper Carboniferous that are distinct enough to be placed in their own order, Pleurojulida. Fossil pleurojulids up to 10 centimeters long are known from Europe and the United States.

References

Millipede families
Carboniferous myriapods
Pennsylvanian first appearances
Pennsylvanian extinctions
Prehistoric arthropod families